The 1962 Rhode Island gubernatorial election was held on November 6, 1962. Republican nominee John Chafee defeated Democratic incumbent John A. Notte Jr. with 50.06% of the vote, a margin of just 398 votes.

Primary elections
Primary elections were held on September 11, 1962.

Democratic primary

Candidates
John A. Notte Jr., incumbent Governor
Kevin K. Coleman, Mayor of Woonsocket
Francis A. Manzi

Results

Republican primary

Candidates
John Chafee, State Representative
Louis V. Jackvony, former Attorney General of Rhode Island
Raymond W. Monaco

Results

General election

Candidates
John Chafee, Republican
John A. Notte Jr., Democratic

Results

References

1962
Rhode Island